Seval Kıraç (born April 28, 1988) is a Turkish women's football forward currently playing in the Turkish Women's First Football League for Kpnak Belediyespor with jersey number 7. She made her Champions League debut in August 2011 with her current club. She played in the Turkey women's U-19 national team before joining the Turkish women's national team.

Playing career

Club

Seval Kıraç began football playing in Yalıspor, a club in Maltepe district of Istanbul, by receiving her license on May 5, 2000. She took part in the youth teams until she transferred to Kartalspor on February 28, 2006. At Kartalspor in Kartal, she played until October 16, 2009, and returned then to her first club Yalıspor. After two seasons, Kıraç signed for Ataşehir Belediyesi on August 5, 2011.

Kıraç debuted in the 2011-12 UEFA Women's Champions League match against Lithuanian champion Gintra Universitetas on August 11, 2011. In the 2011–12 season, she enjoyed Women's First League championship with her team, and played in the 2012-13 UEFA Women's Champions League qualifying matches for Ataşehir Belediyesi once again.

In October 2018, she joined the recently to the Women's First League promoted club ALG Spor in Gaziantep. In the 2019-20 Women's First League season, she transferred to Konak Belediyespor.

International
She made her debut in the Turkey women's national U-19 team in the  UEFA European Women's Under-19 Championship's first qualifying round match against Swiss junior women on September 26, 2006.

Admitted first time to the Turkey women's national team, she played in the match against Georgia on November 23, 2006, at which she scored also one of the nine goals for Turkey.

During the UEFA Support International Tournament in 2008, she netted each one goal in the games against Croatia and Latvia.

In the UEFA Women's Euro 2009 qualifying match against Spanish team, which ended as a 0–4 defeat for Turkey, she scored an own goal.

Career statistics
.

Honours
 Turkish Women's First League=
 Ataşehir Belediyespor
 Winners (1): 2011–12
 Runners-up (4): 2012–13, 2013–14, 2014–15, 2015–16
 Third places (1): 2016–17

 ALG Spor
 Runners-up (1): 2018–19

 Konak Belediyespor
 Third places (1): 2019–20

References

External links

Living people
1988 births
People from Gebze
Turkish women's footballers
Women's association football forwards
Turkey women's international footballers
Ataşehir Belediyespor players
Trabzon İdmanocağı women's players
ALG Spor players
Konak Belediyespor players
Turkish Women's Football Super League players